Tuomas Kristian Seppänen (born 16 May 1986) is a Finnish athlete specialising in the hammer throw. He was born in Pori, and represented his country at three consecutive European Championships, his best outing being the twelfth place in 2014.

His personal best in the event is 76.20 metres set in 2016 in Halle.

Competition record

References

1986 births
Living people
Sportspeople from Pori
Finnish male hammer throwers
World Athletics Championships athletes for Finland
Competitors at the 2011 Summer Universiade
Competitors at the 2013 Summer Universiade
20th-century Finnish people
21st-century Finnish people